Thane Road is a road connecting Juneau with Thane, Alaska. The road is the location for a bicycle race event.

See also

References

Roads in Alaska